Daniel Antonio Core (born July 17, 1981) is an American professional baseball player. He played two seasons for the Brother Elephants of Chinese Professional Baseball League. In April 2009, he was released by the Elephants due to injury.

Core was originally drafted by the Toronto Blue Jays in 2003. He began his career with the short season Class A Auburn Doubledays, later playing for the Class A Lansing Lugnuts and the Advanced-A Dunedin Blue Jays. He was released by Toronto during the 2007 season, signing with the Kansas City T-Bones of the Northern League before joining the Brother Elephants.

Notes

References 

1981 births
American expatriate baseball players in Taiwan
Auburn Doubledays players
Baseball pitchers
Baseball players from New York (state)
Brother Elephants players
Dunedin Blue Jays players
Kansas City T-Bones players
Lansing Lugnuts players
Living people